David Solari may refer to:

 David Solari (cyclist) (born 1968), former cyclist
 David Solari (footballer) (born 1986), Argentine football player